Toyozō is a masculine Japanese given name.

Possible writings
Toyozō can be written using different combinations of kanji characters. Here are some examples:

豊三, "bountiful, three"
豊蔵, "bountiful, store up"
豊造, "bountiful, create"
登代三, "climb up, generation, three"

The name can also be written in hiragana とよぞう or katakana トヨゾウ.

Notable people with the name
 (1894–1985), Japanese potter.
Toyozo Takagi (高木 豊三, 1852–1918), Japanese judicial bureaucrat, judge, lawyer.
 (born 1937), Japanese judge.

Japanese masculine given names